The Lordship of Phocaea was founded after in 1275, when the Genoese nobleman Manuele Zaccaria received the twin towns of Old Phocaea and New Phocaea as a fief from the Byzantine emperor Andronikos II Palaiologos. The Zaccaria family amassed a considerable fortune from their properties there, especially the rich alum mines. The Zaccaria held the lordship until 1340, when it was repossessed by the Byzantines under Andronikos III Palaiologos.

Lords of Old and New Phocaea 

 1275–1288 Manuele Zaccaria 
 1288–1304 Benedetto I Zaccaria 
 1304–1314 Benedetto II Zaccaria 
 1314–1331 Andriolo Cattaneo (he married Aeliana Zaccaria) 
 1331–1340 Domenico Cattaneo

Governors of Old and New Phocaea 

 1302–1307 Tedisio Zaccaria 
 1307 Nicolino Zaccaria 
 1307–1314 Andriolo Cattaneo 
 1329 Arrigo Tartaro

Sources 
 Ανέκδοτα νομίσματα και μολυβδόβουλλα των κατά τους μέσους αιώνας Δυναστών της Ελλάδος / υπό Παύλου Λάμπρου, Εν Αθήναις : Εκ του Τυπογραφείου αδελφών Πέρρη, 1880, pages 66–73
 

 
Phocaea
States of Frankish and Latin Greece
Genoese colonies
States and territories established in 1275
States and territories disestablished in 1340
1340 disestablishments in Asia
Byzantine Empire–Republic of Genoa relations